Bingerville is a town in south-eastern Ivory Coast. It is a suburb of Abidjan and is one of four sub-prefectures of Abidjan Autonomous District. Bingerville is also a commune. The town is located about 10 kilometres east of Abidjan and lies on the Ébrié Lagoon. Villages in the sub-prefecture include Eloka.

Bingerville is home to École militaire préparatoire technique (EMPT), a military academy.

History

Bingerville (13,000 BP) and Iwo-Eleru (11,000 BP) are the most early microlithic industries in West Africa.

Originally a market town, Bingerville grew as the capital of the French colony from 1909 until 1934. It is named after Louis-Gustave Binger, a former French colonial governor. Many colonial buildings survive in the town, which is also known for its botanical gardens.

Prior to the 2011 reorganisation of the subdivisions of Ivory Coast, Bingerville was part of the Lagunes Region.

Notable people
Mamadou Koné, footballer
Wilfried Bony, footballer
Eric Bailly, footballer
Didier Drogba, footballer
Badra Ali Sangaré, footballer

References

Sub-prefectures of Abidjan
Communes of Abidjan
Suburbs in Ivory Coast